Papaipema stenocelis, the chain fern borer, is a species of cutworm or dart moth in the family Noctuidae. It is found in North America.

The MONA or Hodges number for Papaipema stenocelis is 9481.

References

Further reading

 
 
 

Papaipema
Articles created by Qbugbot
Moths described in 1907